Sanjib Chandra Chattopadhyay (Shonjeeb Chôndro Chôţţopaddhae) (1834 – 18 April 1889) was a Bengali writer, poet and journalist. He was the elder brother of Bankim Chandra Chattopadhyay.

Sanjib Chandra was born to an orthodox Brahmin family at Kanthalpara, North 24 Parganas. He was educated at Hooghly Mohsin College, founded by Bengali philanthropist Muhammad Mohsin and Presidency College, Calcutta. He was one of the first graduates of the University of Calcutta.

Sanjib Chandra is widely regarded as a key figure in literary renaissance of Bengal as well as India. Some of his writings, including novels, essays and commentaries, were a breakaway from traditional verse-oriented Indian writings, and provided an inspiration for authors across India.

Early life and background
Bankim Chandra was born in the village Kanthalpara in the town of North 24 Parganas, Near Naihati, in an orthodox Bengali Brahmin family, the youngest of three brothers, to Yadav (or Jadab) Chandra Chattopadhyaya and Durgadebi. His family was orthodox, and his father, a government official who went on to become the Deputy Collector of Midnapur. One of his brothers, Sanjeeb Chandra Chattopadhyay, was also a novelist and his known for his famous book "Palamau".

He was educated at the Hooghly Mohsin College founded by philanthropist Muhammad Mohsin and later at the Presidency College, graduating with a degree in Arts [Law] in 1857. He was among the early graduates of the University of Calcutta. He later obtained a degree in Law as well, in 1869.

He was appointed as Deputy Collector, just like his father, of Jessore, Chattopadhyay went on to become a Deputy Magistrate, retiring from government service in 1891. His years at work were peppered with incidents that brought him into conflict with the ruling British. However, he was made a Companion, Order of the Indian Empire in 1894.

Literary career
Bangadarshan was published by his editorial ship.

Palamou - A travel literature, considered as a classic.

Bengal Ryots : Their Rights and Liabilities

References

Further reading 
 Ujjal Kumar Majumdar: Bankim Chandra Chattopadhyay: His Contribution to Indian Life and Culture. Calcutta : The Asiatic Society, 2000. .
 Walter Ruben: Indische Romane. Eine ideologische Untersuchung. Vol. 1: Einige Romane Bankim Chattopadhyays iund Ranbindranath Tagore. Berlin: Akademie Verlag, 1964. (German)
 Bhabatosh Chatterjee, Editor : Bankimchandra Chatterjee : Essays in Perspective (Sahitya Akademi, New Delhi) 1994.

External links

1838 births
1899 deaths
Presidency University, Kolkata alumni
Hooghly Mohsin College alumni
Bengali writers
Bengali-language writers
Indian civil servants
Indian male novelists
Indian novelists
Indian poets
Indian male poets
Indian travel writers
Indian male writers
Indian editors
Indian magazine editors
Novelists from West Bengal
Writers from Kolkata
People from North 24 Parganas district
University of Calcutta alumni
Writers of historical romances
Bengali Hindus
19th-century Bengalis
19th-century Indian male writers
19th-century Indian novelists
19th-century novelists
19th-century Indian poets
19th-century Bengali poets
Journalists from West Bengal
Indian journalists
19th-century Indian journalists
Indian male journalists
Indian newspaper journalists
19th-century Indian essayists
Indian male essayists
Poets from West Bengal
Bengali poets
Bengali-language poets
People from West Bengal